The 2014 Alabama State Hornets football team represented Alabama State University as a member of the East Division of the Southwestern Athletic Conference (SWAC) during 2014 NCAA Division I FCS football season. Led by Reggie Barlow in his eighth and final season as head coach, the Hornets compiled an overall record of 7–5 with a mark of 5–4 in conference play, placing second in the SWAC East Division. Alabama State played home games at New ASU Stadium in Montgomery, Alabama.

On November 24, Barlow was fired. He finished his tenure at Alabama State with a record of 49–42.

Schedule

References

Alabama State
Alabama State Hornets football seasons
Alabama State Hornets football